(814–891) was a Japanese Buddhist monk who founded of the Jimon school of Tendai Buddhism and Chief Abbot of Mii-dera at the foot of Mount Hiei. After succeeding to the post of Tendai , in 873, a strong rivalry developed between his followers and those of Ennin's at Enryaku-ji (note: Ennin had died in 864). 

The rivalry was largely geographical, and was not based much on sectarian differences over interpretations of practice or doctrine; nevertheless, the friction between the followers of the two zasu finally broke out into a violent conflict. Rivalres between the followers of different zasu were not anything new at that time. During his twelve years on Hiei, Enchin himself saw a conflict between direct disciples of Saichō (namely Enchō and Kōshō) and the disciples of his own master, the second Tendai zasu Gishin. After the death of Gishin, his main follower, Enshu, was elected as the third zasu, but Enchō and Kōshō objected and finally forced Enshu and his followers to leave Mount Hiei.  

Most significantly, Enchin united the Tendai school's teachings with those of Chinese Esoteric Buddhism, and interpreted the Lotus Sutra from the point of view of esoteric teachings as well as used Tendai terminology in order to explain the esoteric Mahavairocana Tantra.

Enchin is said to have supported the worship of native gods (kami) and certain elements of Confucianism. In a memorial speech in 887, he noted the respect the court of Tang China had for Japan because of Japan's encouragement and welcoming of the ideals of li and yi. He warned that though Enryaku-ji was founded with the native gods in mind, "no such officiating monks are provided for the main deities of the mountain. This is certainly a breach of Li.  There ought to be two monks to worship the two gods."

References

Japanese scholars of Buddhism
814 births
891 deaths
Tendai
Japanese Buddhist clergy
9th-century Japanese calligraphers
Shugendō practitioners
Founders of Buddhist sects
Heian period Buddhist clergy